Leporinus reticulatus is a species of Leporinus found in the Arinos River basin in the Tapajós River drainage in South America. This species can reach a length of  SL.

References

Oyakawa, O.T., 1998. Catalogo dos tipos de peixes recentes do Museu de Zoologia da USP. I. Characiformes (Teleostei: Ostariophysi). Pap. Avuls. Zool. 39(23):443-507. 

Taxa named by Heraldo Antonio Britski
Taxa named by Júlio César Garavello
Taxa described in 1993
Fish described in 1993
Anostomidae